Liolaemus paulinae is a species of lizard in the family Liolaemidae.

Etymology
Both the specific name, paulinae, and the common name, Paulina's tree iguana, are in honor of Paulina who is one of the daughters of Roberto Donoso-Barros.

Geographic range
L. paulinae is endemic to the Antofagasta Region of Chile.

Habitat
The preferred habitat of L. paulinae is shrubland.

Reproduction
L. paulinae is viviparous.

References

Further reading
Donoso-Barros R (1961). "Three New Lizards of the Genus Liolaemus from the Highest Andes of Chile and Argentina". Copeia 1961 (4): 387–391. (Liolaemus paulinae, new species, p. 387).
Donoso-Barros R (1966). Reptiles de Chile. Santiago, Chile: Ediciones de la Universidad de Chile. 458 + cxlvi pp., 32 color plates, 175 black-and-white plates, text figures, maps. (in Spanish).
Núñez, Herman; Veloso, Alberto (2001). "Distribución geográfica de las especies de lagartos de la Región de Antofagasta, Chile". Boletín del Museo Nacional de Historia Natural, Chile 50: 109–120. (in Spanish, with an abstract in English).

paulinae
Lizards of South America
Endemic fauna of Chile
Reptiles of Chile
Reptiles described in 1961
Taxa named by Roberto Donoso-Barros
Taxonomy articles created by Polbot